The Best of Pantera: Far Beyond the Great Southern Cowboys' Vulgar Hits! is a compilation album by American heavy metal band Pantera, released on September 23, 2003, two months before their breakup. The title of the compilation is a combination of the titles of their first four major label albums.

The compilation includes an audio CD of 15 previously released tracks and one previously unreleased track, plus a DVD with 12 music videos, two of them live. The tracks on the CD include songs from all six major label albums (two from Cowboys from Hell, three from Vulgar Display of Power, four from Far Beyond Driven, one from The Great Southern Trendkill, one from Official Live: 101 Proof, and three from Reinventing the Steel), as well as three cover songs, all in chronological order. The compilation album reached No. 38 on the Billboard 200 chart and was certified Gold by the RIAA in August 2004 and Platinum in January 2006.

The International version of the album, titled Reinventing Hell: The Best of Pantera (combination of the titles of their albums Reinventing the Steel and Cowboys from Hell), is almost identical. It has different artwork and a cardboard slip cover. It also has different tracks than its US counterpart and is available as a standard version or with a DVD.

Track listing

 Tracks 1–2 from Cowboys from Hell
 Tracks 3–5 from Vulgar Display of Power
 Tracks 6–9 from Far Beyond Driven
 Track 10 from The Great Southern Trendkill
 Track 11 from Official Live: 101 Proof
 Track 12 from the Detroit Rock City soundtrack
 Track 13–15 from Reinventing the Steel
 Track 16 from Revolution Is My Name EP

International version (Reinventing Hell)

 Tracks 1–3 are found on Cowboys from Hell
 Tracks 4–7 are found on Vulgar Display of Power
 Tracks 8–11 are found on Far Beyond Driven
 Track 12 is found on The Great Southern Trendkill
 Track 13 is found on Official Live: 101 Proof
 Track 14 is found on Reinventing the Steel
 Track 15 is found on Revolution Is My Name or the Heavy Metal 2000 and The Texas Chainsaw Massacre soundtrack
 Track 16 is found on Far Beyond Driven (Japanese and 'Driven Downunder' editions only) or Planet Caravan Part 1 and Planet Caravan Part 2 or The Crow soundtrack

DVD music videos
 "Cowboys from Hell"
 "Psycho Holiday"
 "Cemetery Gates"
 "Mouth for War"
 "This Love"
 "Walk"
 "5 Minutes Alone"
 "I'm Broken"
 "Drag the Waters"
 "Domination" (live)
 "Primal Concrete Sledge" (live)
 "Revolution Is My Name"

Personnel

 Phil Anselmo – vocals
 Dimebag Darrell – guitar, producer, mixing
 Rex Brown – bass
 Vinnie Paul – drums, producer, mixing, engineer
 Matt Lane – mixing assistant
 Ulrich Wild – engineer
 Mark McKenna – art direction
 Sean Beavan – assistant engineer
 Neil Zlozower – photography
 Lamont Hyde – assistant engineer
 Jay Blakesberg – photography
 Sevie Bates – art direction
 Sterling Winfield – producer, engineer, mixing assistant, mixing, assistant engineer
 Steve Woolard – discographical annotation
 Emily Cagan – project assistant
 George Desota – photography
 Kenny Nemes – project assistant
 Steve Pokorny – remastering
 Joe Giron – photography
 Karen Ahmed – compilation producer
 Valerie Valera – project assistant
 Randy Perry – project assistant
 Ginger Dettman – project assistant
 Hiro Arishima – liner notes
 Terence Butler – arranger
 John Atashian – photography
 Dorothy Stefanski – editorial supervision
 Ashely Maile – photography
 Bob King – photography
 Terry Date – producer, engineer, mixing
 Kimberly Davis – compilation producer
 Dan Hersch – remastering
 Tony Iommi – arranger
 Tim Kimsey – mixing assistant
 Ted Nugent – arranger
 Ozzy Osbourne – arranger
 Pantera – arranger, producer, mixing
 John Kirkpatrick – compilation producer

Charts

Certifications

References

2003 greatest hits albums
Pantera albums
Rhino Records compilation albums